The Barker is a 1928 part-talkie pre-Code romantic drama film produced and released by First National Pictures, a subsidiary of Warner Bros., acquired in September 1928. The film was directed by George Fitzmaurice and stars Milton Sills, Dorothy Mackaill, Betty Compson, and Douglas Fairbanks Jr.

The film is based on the Broadway play of the same name which opened at the Biltmore Theatre January 18, 1927 and ran until July 1927 for 221 performances. In the stage production Walter Huston was "Nifty" and a still relatively unknown Claudette Colbert was "Lou", played in the film by Dorothy Mackaill.

The film was adapted by Benjamin Glazer, Joseph Jackson and Herman J. Mankiewicz from the play by Kenyon Nicholson. The Barker is a part-talkie with talking sequences and sequences with synchronized musical scoring and sound effects.

Plot
The film tells the story of a woman (Dorothy Mackaill) who comes between a man (Milton Sills) and his estranged son (Douglas Fairbanks Jr.). Sills is a carnival barker who is in love with a dancing girl and is ambitious to have his son, Fairbanks, become a lawyer. Fairbanks has other ideas and during his vacation he hops a freight, joins the carnival, and weds a dancing girl (Mackaill). Eventually, Fairbanks fulfills the ambition his father had for him.

Cast
Betty Compson as Carrie
Milton Sills as Nifty Miller
Dorothy Mackaill as Lou
Douglas Fairbanks Jr. as Chris Miller
Sylvia Ashton as Ma Benson
George Cooper as Hap Spissel
S. S. Simon as Col. Gowdy
Tom Dugan as Stuttering Spieker

Uncredited:
Bobby Dunn as Hamburger concessionaire
Pat Harmon as Heckler
Bynunsky Hyman as Fire Eater
Gladden James as Member of Hawaiian Trio
Charles Sullivan as Man in audience
Pat West as Bartender

Awards and honors

Preservation status
The film survives intact with its talking sequences and has been preserved by the UCLA Film and Television Archive and manufactured-on-demand DVD by the Warner Archive Collection.

Remakes
The Barker was remade as Hoop-La (1933) with Clara Bow and as Diamond Horseshoe (1945) with Betty Grable. Japanese director Yasujirō Ozu remade this film (without crediting the original) as A Story of Floating Weeds (1934) and again as Floating Weeds (1959).

See also

 List of early Warner Bros. talking features

References

External links

 
 

1928 films
1928 romantic drama films
American black-and-white films
American films based on plays
American romantic drama films
American silent feature films
Early sound films
Films directed by George Fitzmaurice
First National Pictures films
Films scored by Louis Silvers
Films with screenplays by Herman J. Mankiewicz
Transitional sound films
1920s English-language films
1920s American films
Silent romantic drama films
Silent American drama films